Lucretia Peabody Hale (September 2, 1820 – June 12, 1900) was an American journalist and author.

Biography
Hale was born in Boston, Massachusetts, and educated at George B. Emerson's school there. Subsequently she devoted herself to literature, and was a member of the Boston School Committee for two years.

Principal works 

Hale published numerous stories in periodicals and newspapers, some of which were collected in books.

Novels
Six of One by Half a Dozen of the Other, 1872
The Wolf at the Door,  1877

Juvenile writings
The Peterkin Papers,  1880
The Last of the Peterkins with Others of Their Kin, 1886

Books of devotion
The Struggle for Life, a Story of Home, 1861
The Lord's Supper and its Observance, 1866
The Service of Sorrow,  1867

Miscellaneous
Designs in Outline for Art-Needlework, 1879
Fagots for the Fireside,  1888

Family
Hale's parents were Nathan Hale and Sarah Preston Everett, who had a total of eleven children. Nathan Hale, nephew and namesake of the Nathan Hale the American patriot hero, was a lawyer and editor/owner of the Boston Daily Advertiser, while her mother, also an author, was a sister of Edward Everett, a Unitarian minister and politician. Lucretia's brother, Edward Everett Hale, was also a Unitarian minister as well as a prolific author in his own right.

References 
 "Hale, Lucretia Peabody" American Authors 1600-1900, The H. W. Wilson Company, 1938
 "HALE, Lucretia Peabody" Notable American Women, Vol. 2, 4th ed., The Belknap Press of Harvard University Press, 1975

External links 

 
 
 
 dorchesteratheneum.org
 Hale stories in Mister Ron's Basement – RonEvry.com index to podcast series
 

1820 births
1900 deaths
19th-century American novelists
19th-century American women writers
American women short story writers
Boston School Committee members
Writers from Boston
American women novelists
19th-century American short story writers
19th-century American politicians
Novelists from Massachusetts